The 1987 Tunisian coup d'état involved the bloodless ousting of the aging President of Tunisia Habib Bourguiba on 7 November 1987, and his replacement as President by his recently appointed Prime Minister, Zine El Abidine Ben Ali. The action was justified by reference to Bourguiba's failing health and Article 57 of the country's constitution. Reports later surfaced to indicate that the Italian intelligence services had been involved in planning it.  

Sources sometimes identify the 1987 coup as the "Révolution de jasmin" (Jasmin Revolution) as the jasmine flower is considered a symbol of Tunisia. However, more recent sources also use exactly the same term to identify the 2011 Tunisian Revolution.

Events
During the night of 6 November 1987, a group of seven doctors signed a medical report attesting to the mental incapacity of Bourguiba. Political journalist Mezri Haddad summarised the report as follows:

At the same time, Bourguiba demanded new trials for 15 suspected Islamists, and that all but three of them be hanged by the following weekend. When this order became known, a number of Tunisian political leaders, including longtime supporters of Bourguiba, feared that Bourguiba was no longer acting or thinking rationally. Later, one human rights activist said that if the orders had been carried out, it would have triggered a civil war.

In justification of the coup, Prime Minister Ben Ali invoked Article 57 of the constitution, as he assumed power. He rapidly emerged, therefore, not merely as the constitutional president, but also as the commander in chief of the army. The journalists  and Jean-Pierre Tuquoi summarise the circumstances under which the necessary medical opinion had been obtained:

The next day the new president addressed the nation on Radio Tunis. He paid tribute to the huge sacrifices that his predecessor had made, supported by brave men, in his service to the liberation and development of Tunisia. At the same time Ben Ali took the opportunity to make a declaration: "In the times in which we live it is not longer enough to put up either with presidencies for life or with automatic succession for the head of state, under a system from which the people are excluded. Our people deserve a modern politics, based on a genuinely multi-party system incorporating a plurality of mass organisations." The further justification was later given that fundamentalist movements were preparing a coup of their own, and had prepared a list of assassination targets in connection with their plans.

Intelligence head's revelations and prime ministerial denials 
Fulvio Martini, a former head of the Italian Intelligence Service, gave an interview to the newspaper la Repubblica on 11 October 1997 in which he asserted that Italian Intelligence had played an important role in the removal of Bourgiba. "Everything began with the visit of the Italian Prime Minister Bettino Craxi to Algeria in 1984", he explained. "The Algerians were nervous about growing instability in Tunisia and were ready to intervene" because of the risks the situation presented to their own strategic interests. This meant that the Algerian army was ready to invade the part of Tunisia crossed by the natural-gas pipeline transporting Algerian gas to Sicily. Martini continued: "In 1985 Prime Minister Craxi asked me to go to Algeria and establish contact with the security services there ... in order to avert any sudden move by Algeria. That was the start of a lengthy foreign policy operation in which the security services played a central role. In the end the parties agreed that General Ben Ali would be better able to guarantee the stability of Tunisia than Bourguiba." Martini added: "We suggested this solution to the Algerians and they discussed it with the Libyans. I went to talk to the French [...but...] the French security chief at that time, René Imbot reacted with arrogance, and simply stated that we Italians should not become involved, because Tunisia was part of France's imperial legacy".

The priority was to organise a coup as invisible as possible, and this gave rise to the idea of a "medical coup". Italy would guarantee to support a Ben Ali takeover, and this choice was also approved by Libya and Algeria. "It is true that Italy replaced Bourguiba with Ben Ali" Martini agreed after 10 October 1999 when la Repubblica (the newspaper) referred to a report that Martini had revealed before a parliamentary commission on 6 October 1999. On the other hand, Prime Minister Craxi disputed any involvement by the Italian Security Services. Also speaking on 10 October 1999 he addresses the French Press Agency office in Tunis: "There was no Italian manoeuvring or interference in the events that carried President Ben Ali to power in 1987". The closeness of Craxi's own complicated and long standing relationship with the Tunisian political establishment led at one commentator to prefer his version of events to that of his intelligence chief. Craxi remained a close friend of Ben Ali, and died in Tunisia in 2000.

Aftermath
Ben Ali took control of the ruling Socialist Destourian Party, renamed it and transformed it into the Democratic Constitutional Rally. The promised elections took place in 1989 and were won by the new party. In principal, Ben Ali followed similar policies to Bourguiba, positioning himself as the spiritual successor to his superannuated predecessor. He remained in power for 23 years until 2011, when he was deposed in the Tunisian Revolution.

Notes

References

20th-century revolutions
1980s coups d'état and coup attempts
Modern history of Tunisia
1987 in Tunisia
Military coups in Tunisia
1987 in military history
Conflicts in 1987
November 1987 events in Africa